Homoeocera magnolimbata is a moth of the subfamily Arctiinae. It is found in French Guiana.

References

Euchromiina
Moths described in 1911